Tacyba tenuis is a species of beetle in the family Cerambycidae, the only species in the genus Tacyba.

References

Heteropsini